Bis[(2-diphenylphosphino)phenyl] ether, also known as DPEphos, is a wide bite angle diphosphine ligand used in inorganic and organometallic chemistry.  The name DPEphos is derived from diphenyl ether (DPE) which makes up the ligand's backbone.  It is similar to Xantphos, another diphosphine ligand, but is more flexible and has a smaller bite angle (104 vs 108°). It is synthesized from chlorodiphenylphosphine and DPE.

References

Diphosphines
Phenyl compounds